Eduardo Virginio Gallegos González (born January 12, 2000, in Ciudad Victoria, Tamaulipas) is a Mexican professional footballer who currently plays for UAT.

External links
 
 Ascenso MX

Living people
1992 births
Mexican footballers
Association football forwards
Correcaminos UAT footballers
Ascenso MX players
People from Ciudad Victoria
Footballers from Tamaulipas
21st-century Mexican people